A nephew is a son of a sibling. 

Nephew may also refer to:

People
 Nephew Tommy (born 1967), American comedian
 Jasper Nephew, guitarist for Owl City
 John Nephew, American game designer
 Neil Nephew (1939–1978), American actor
 Richard Nephew, American nuclear weapons expert
 Francisco de Montejo (the Nephew) (1514–1572), Spanish conquistador
 Robert Livingston the Younger (1663–1725; nicknamed "The Nephew"), New York politician
 William Tayloe (the nephew) (1645–1710), English planter in Virginia

Entertainment
 The Nephew, a 1998 drama film
 Nephew (band), a rock band from Denmark
 "Nephew" (Smokepurpp song), a 2018 song by Smokepurpp

See also

 Cardinal-nephew of the Roman Catholic Church
 Second nephew in familial relations
 Frédéric Mistral (great-nephew) (1893-1968) French linguist and lawyer
 Guillaume Durand (nephew) (died 1330; "Guillaum Durand, le neveu") French clergyman
 William of Bitton (nephew) (died 1274; "William of Bitton, the nephew") Bishop of Bath and Wells
 Great Nephew, a British racehorse
 
 Nefew, a hip hop group from Switzerland